Kadapa mandal is one of the 50 mandals in Kadapa district of the Indian state of Andhra Pradesh. It is administered under Kadapa revenue division and its headquarters are located at Kadapa. The mandal is bounded by Chennur, Sidhout and Chinthakommadinne mandals.

Towns and villages 

Kadapa mandal consists of Kadapa Municipal Corporation and its urban agglomerations. It is fully an urban mandal and has no villages.

See also 
List of mandals in Andhra Pradesh

References

Mandals in Kadapa district